The New Interns is a 1964 American drama film directed by John Rich, and the sequel to the 1962 film The Interns, itself based on the novel of the same name by Richard Frede. It stars Michael Callan and Dean Jones. For his performance, George Segal won the Golden Globe Award for New Star of the Year – Actor. The movie and its predecessor later spawned a short-lived TV show, The Interns, that aired on CBS from 1970 to 1971.

Plot
After a nervous breakdown, Dr. Alec Considine comes back to New North Hospital for another year of internship. He develops an immediate attraction for a student nurse, Laura Rogers, but she's not so inclined unless he's got marriage in mind.

Social worker Nancy Terman is sexually assaulted by juvenile delinquents who grew up in the same neighborhood as Dr. Tony "Shiv" Pirelli. New intern Dr. Tony Pirelli quarrels with Riccio and falls in love with Nancy as well.

As other personal dramas occur, including newlywed Dr. Lew Worship discovering he is sterile and cannot have children, Nancy's attackers end up in a fracas at the hospital and Alec ends up injured. After his recovery, Alec decides to marry Laura and remain on New North's staff.

Cast
Michael Callan as Dr. Alec Considine
Dean Jones as Dr. Lew Worship
Telly Savalas as Dr. Dominick 'Dom' Riccio
Stefanie Powers as Gloria Worship née Mead
Barbara Eden as Nurse Laura Rogers
Adrienne Ellis as Nurse
George Segal as Dr. Tony "Shiv" Parelli
Inger Stevens as Nancy Terman
Greg Morris as Dr. Pete Clarke
Dawn Wells as Bobbie
Kaye Stevens as Nurse Didi Loomis

Production
The Interns was a commercial success and Columbia announced a follow up. It was thought James MacArthur, Michael Callan, Stefanie Powers, Telly Savalas and Kay Stevens would return, Cliff Robertson and Suzy Parker would not, and Nick Adams may make a guest appearance.
 An original story was written by Wilton Schiller, producer of Ben Casey.

Kay Stevens signed a three-picture deal with producer Robert Cohn the first of which was to be The Interns.

George Segal came out to Hollywood from New York to star in a TV series. When that was cancelled after four episodes, he was signed to make the film. Columbia put him under long-term contract.

James MacArthur's old role ended up being played by Dean Jones who had just made Under the Yum Yum Tree for Columbia. A key female role was given to Inger Stevens who was then appearing in the TV series The Farmer's Daughter.

Michael Callan and Stefanie Powers, under contract to Columbia, reprised their role from the original. Callan signed a six-picture deal with Columbia.

References

External links
 
 

1964 films
Films set in hospitals
Medical-themed films
Columbia Pictures films
1964 drama films
American drama films
American sequel films
Films directed by John Rich
1960s English-language films
1960s American films